The flag of Minsk Voblast is the official flag of Minsk Voblast, Belarus. It was approved on November 22, 2007, by decree #595 of the President. The flag has a red field whose obverse side is charged with the coat of arms of Minsk voblast. It has a 1:2 ratio.

References

2007 establishments in Belarus
Minsk
Culture in Minsk
History of Minsk